Mostov is a surname. Notable people with the surname include:

Joanna Angel (born Joanna Mostov; 1980), American actress, director, and writer
Julie Mostov, American political scientist
Keith E. Mostov (born 1956), American biologist